The Phillips Code is a brevity code (shorthand) created in 1879 by Walter P. Phillips (then of the Associated Press) for the rapid transmission of press reports by telegraph. It defined hundreds of abbreviations and initialisms for commonly used words that news authors and copy desk staff would commonly use. There were subcodes for commodities and stocks called the Market Code, a Baseball Supplement, and single-letter codes for Option Months. The last official edition was published in 1925, but there was also a Market supplement last published in 1909 that was separate.

The code consists of a dictionary of common words or phrases and their associated abbreviations. Extremely common terms are represented by a single letter (C: See; Y: Year); those less frequently used gain successively longer abbreviations (Ab: About; Abb: Abbreviate; Abty: Ability; Acmpd: Accompanied). 

Later, The Evans Basic English Code expanded the 1,760 abbreviations in the Phillips Code to 3,848 abbreviations.

Examples of use 
Using the Phillips Code, this ten-word telegraphic transmission:

ABBG LG WORDS CAN SAVE XB AMTS MON AVOG FAPIB

expands to this:

Abbreviating long words can save exorbitant amounts of money, avoiding filing a petition in bankruptcy.

In 1910, an article explaining the basic structure and purpose of the Phillips Code appeared in various US newspapers and magazines. One example given is:

T tri o HKT ft mu o SW on Ms roof garden, nw in pg, etc.which the article translates as:

The trial of Harry K. Thaw for the murder of Stanford White on Madison Square Roof Garden, now in progress, etc.

Notable codes 
The terms POTUS and SCOTUS originated in the code. SCOTUS appeared in the very first edition of 1879 and POTUS was in use by 1895, and was officially included in the 1923 edition. These abbreviations entered common parlance when news gathering services, in particular, the Associated Press, adopted the terminology.

Telegraph operators would often interleave Phillips Code with numeric wire signals that had been developed during the American Civil War era, such as the 92 Code. These codes were used by railroad telegraphers to indicate logistics instructions and they proved to be useful when describing an article's priority or confirming its transmission and receipt. This meta-data would occasionally appear in print when typesetters included the codes in newspapers, especially the code for "No more—the end", abbreviated as "- 30 -" on a typewriter.

Excerpts of the codes

Editions 
 1879: The Phillips Telegraphic Code for the Rapid Transmission by Telegraph, published by Gibson Brothers Printers
 1909 Market Supplement
 1918 edition (implied by an article in the September 1923 edition of the Commercial Telegraphers' Journal, Volume 21)
 April 1, 1923, edited by E. E. Bruckner and published by Telegraph & Telephone Age.
 1925

See also
 Morse code
 Morse code abbreviations
 Wire signal
 Scribal abbreviation
 List of shorthand systems

References

1879 introductions
Brevity codes
Encodings
Telegraphy
Shorthand systems
Writing systems